Efren Rodarte is a retired American soccer player who in 1993 led the USISL in scoring.  He played professionally in the American Professional Soccer League and USISL.

In 1990, Rodarte signed with the Colorado Foxes of the American Professional Soccer League.  He played both the 1990 and 1991 season with the Foxes.  In 1992, he moved to the El Paso Patriots of the USISL, leading the league in scoring.  He continued to play for the Patriots until 1999.

References

Living people
American soccer players
American Professional Soccer League players
Colorado Foxes players
El Paso Patriots players
USISL players
Association football forwards
Association football midfielders
Year of birth missing (living people)